The adoption of plug-in electric vehicles in New Zealand is supported by incentives and policies devised by the New Zealand Government. The monetary incentives include electric vehicle discounts, exemptions from road user charges and electric vehicle sales targets.

Electric vehicle ownership 
As of December 2022, there were 68,543 electric vehicles in New Zealand. In September 2021, New Zealand's electric vehicle registrations reached 12.5% of new car sales. This was an increase from electric vehicles representing 6.45% of new car sales in July 2021. Furthermore, new passenger vehicle sales also consisted of 11.8% electric vehicle registrations in July 2021. Approximately 43% of the battery electric vehicles (BEVs) and plug-in electric vehicles (PHEVs) sold in New Zealand in September 2021, were pure-electric vehicles. September 2021 was also the first month in which pure-electric vehicles had outsold hybrid vehicles in New Zealand. In fact, 21% of all vehicle sales in September 2021 had some form of electrification. New Zealand had originally aimed for 2% of all new vehicle sales to be EVs by the end of 2021, or have a minimum of 64,000 electric vehicle sales yearly. 1 in 5 car sales in September 2021 were electric vehicles in New Zealand.

The New Zealand Government has a target for 50% of all light vehicle registrations by 2029 to be electric vehicles, and 100% by 2035. The New Zealand Government will ban the sale and importation of petrol and diesel vehicles between 2035 and 2040. This is despite the Climate Change Commission recommending banning petrol and diesel cars by 2032. Higher parking fees, congestion charges and road pricing are also being considered by the government to increase EV adoption.

In 2020 and 2021, New Zealand's most popular electric cars were the Tesla Model 3, Hyundai Kona Electric, Nissan Leaf and the MG ZS EV. Tesla is also one of the top five best selling car manufacturers in New Zealand. While in September 2021, the Tesla Model 3 was the second most popular vehicle sold in New Zealand overall. The Tesla Model 3 has been the highest selling EV in New Zealand since 2019.

In 2020 there were more EVs in New Zealand than Australia, despite Australia having five times the population of New Zealand. However, since 2021 Australia has overtaken New Zealand in having more total electric vehicles on the road. 26,000 EVs were registered in New Zealand in 2020 and the government plans to have an additional 60,000 electric vehicles on New Zealand roads by 2023. However, in 2019 New Zealand planned to have 64,000 electric vehicle in the country by 2021, when it was projected New Zealand would reach 100% electric vehicle sales by 2030. As of 2021, New Zealand plans to lead Asia in electric vehicle adoption and through having the highest EV market share of new car sales by 2029. New Zealand has been called "The Norway of the Pacific" for the country's high EV uptake. The government plans for 30,000 EVs to be sold in 2025. 30% of New Zealand's light vehicle fleet is planned to be electric by 2035. The Government targets to reduce car travel by 20% by 2035.

, about 65,700 light-duty plug-in electric vehicles were registered in New Zealand. The country's most popular new EVs in 2022 were the Tesla Model Y, Tesla Model 3 and Mitsubishi Eclipse Cross.

New Zealand's Prime Minister Jacinda Ardern drives a Hyundai IONIQ and drove Stephen Colbert in it when he was touring New Zealand.

In September 2021, it was reported that year-to-date Lexus electrified sales accounted for 69% of total sales in New Zealand.

Government incentives 
The National-led government launched an Electric Vehicle Programme in May 2016, in order to encourage EV uptake. Electric vehicles in New Zealand were exempt from road user charges and this has since been extended until 31 March 2024. EV owners were able to access bus lanes and get preferential parking, however that was removed due to limited success and local authorities did not want the effectiveness of bus lanes watered down. There are subsidies available for the installation of public EV chargers. New Zealand also proposed a “cash for clunkers” scheme, incentivising low-income drivers to trade their petrol or diesel cars for a discounted electric vehicle.

In July 2019, the government proposed their original Clean Car Discount of up to $8,000 NZD on purchases of new zero-emissions vehicles, coupled with a proposed charge of up to $3,000 NZD for new vehicles that emit more than 250g of carbon dioxide per kilometre. The Clean Car Discount came into effect in July 2021, with a used EV also able to be subsidised up to $3,450 and a used PHEV up to $2,300.

In 2022 the Government enacted a Clean Car Standard that would phase-in a stepped reduction in the average emissions of most new and used imported passenger vehicles to 145 grams per kilometre travelled in 2023, dropping to 63.3g/km in 2027, with financial penalties if the targets are not met. These targets would ensure New Zealand cleans the entire car fleet by 2027 and both achieves and surpasses the European Union's own fuel efficiency targets. As well as setting  targets, the Clean Vehicles Act passed February 2022 also imposed charges on the purchase of high  emission cars, which will accelerate electric vehicle adoption.

Statistics

References 

New Zealand
Road transport in New Zealand